The Grand Musée du Parfum was a Paris perfumery museum that operated from December 22, 2016 to July 6, 2018. It was founded by entrepreneur Guillaume de Maussion and overseen by industry experts including Jean-Claude Ellena, then the in-house perfumer at Hermes; Mathilde Laurent, house perfumer at Cartier; and Sylvaine Delacourte, director of fragrance for Guerlain. The museum, developed over two years for $7 million, was located in the hôtel particulier (townhouse mansion) at 73, rue du Faubourg Saint-Honoré, once the residence of the Roederer champagne family and later the location of fashion house Christian Lacroix. Entry cost between 5 and 14.50 Euro. Exhibits included a recreation of the laboratory of French perfume house Houbigant (founded in 1775 at 19, rue du Faubourg-Saint-Honoré), using items on loan from the Musée Carnavalet (the museum of the history of Paris). It also had a "garden of scent" with white sculptures that each released different scents.

References

Museums established in 2016
Museums disestablished in 2018
Museums in Paris
Defunct museums in Paris
Cosmetic industry
Perfumery